"Runaway Boys" is the debut single by American rockabilly band Stray Cats, released November 21, 1980 by Arista Records in the UK, where it peaked at No. 9 on the Singles Chart. Its biggest success was in Finland, where it reached number one. The song was later included on the band's 1981 self-titled debut album.

Its first US release, by EMI America, was on the June 1982 album Built for Speed.

Cover versions
"Runaway Boys" was later covered by Drake Bell on his 2014 album Ready, Steady, Go!, which was produced by Brian Setzer.

Charts

Weekly Charts

Year-end charts

References

1980 songs
1980 debut singles
Stray Cats songs
Number-one singles in Finland
Songs written by Brian Setzer
Arista Records singles
Ariola Records singles